Onomastus jamestaylori, is a species of spider of the genus Onomastus. It is endemic to Sri Lanka.

References

External links
Onomastus

Endemic fauna of Sri Lanka
Salticidae
Spiders of Asia
Spiders described in 2016